The Sibelius Monument by Eila Hiltunen is dedicated to the Finnish composer Jean Sibelius (1865–1957). The monument is located at the Sibelius Park in the district of Töölö in Helsinki, the capital city of Finland.

Description
The monument is a sculpture by Finnish artist Eila Hiltunen titled Passio Musicae and was unveiled on September 7, 1967. The sculpture won a competition, organised by the Sibelius Society, following the composer's death in 1957. The competition took two rounds after one early winner was abandoned. Originally it sparked a lively debate about the merits and flaws of abstract art and although the design looked like stylised organ pipes it was known that the composer had created little music for organs. Hiltunen addressed her critics by adding the face of Sibelius which sits beside the main sculpture.

It consists of series of more than 600 hollow steel pipes welded together in a wave-like pattern. The monument weighs  and measures . Hiltunen's aim was to capture the essence of the music of Sibelius.

A smaller version of the monument, "Homage to Sibelius", is located at the UNESCO headquarters in Paris. A work with a similar concept, also designed by Hiltunen, is located at the grounds of the Headquarters of the United Nations in New York City.

Sibelius Park and Kalevala Monument
In 1939 the Leo and Regina Wainstein Foundation organised a competition for sculptors to design a work that depicted a scene from Finland's national epic The Kalevala, which would be erected in the park. The winner was Aarre Aaltonen (1889–1980) and his work Ilmatar and the Scaup, in bronze, was unveiled in 1946.

Gallery

References

External links
Virtual tour of Sibelius Monument

Buildings and structures in Helsinki
Statues and sculptures in Helsinki
Monuments to composers
Monument
1967 sculptures
Steel sculptures in Finland
1967 establishments in Finland
Outdoor sculptures in Finland
Monuments and memorials in Finland
Sculptures of men
Sound sculptures
Töölö